The A3 motorway is a major motorway in Croatia spanning . The motorway connects Zagreb, the nation's capital, to the Slavonia region and a number of cities along the Sava River. It represents a major east–west transportation corridor in Croatia and a significant part of the Pan-European Corridor X, serving as a transit route between the European Union states and the Balkans. Apart from Zagreb, where the A3 motorway comprises a considerable part of the Zagreb bypass, the motorway runs near a number of significant Croatian cities.

The motorway consists of two traffic lanes and an emergency lane in each driving direction, separated by a central reservation. All intersections of the A3 motorway are grade separated, and the motorway comprises several large stack and cloverleaf interchanges at junctions with four other motorways in Croatia: A1, A2, A4 and A5. There is a cloverleaf interchange is on the A3 route, where the A11 motorway is scheduled to branch off. The route comprises a large number of bridges and culverts, but has no tunnels because it runs through plains. The Sava River Bridge is the most significant structure on the A3. Currently, there are 21 exits and 18 rest areas operating along the route. A large part of the motorway is tolled using a ticket system; one section uses an open toll collection system. The Zagreb bypass sections are not tolled. The toll is charged according to vehicle classification in Croatia. The A3 motorway is operated by Hrvatske autoceste.

Construction of the six-lane motorway began in 1977, initially as the Zagreb bypass, then continued in the 1980s as an expansion of the existing two-lane road between Zagreb and Belgrade. The construction was suspended in the first part of the 1990s, due to the Croatian War of Independence, and resumed in 1996. Construction of the entire route was completed in 2006; further development entails new exits, new rest areas and the reconstruction of the existing motorway. The construction cost of the A3 motorway is estimated at 7 billion Croatian kuna (approximately 958.9 million euro).



Route description
The A3 motorway is a major east–west motorway in Croatia connecting the capital of the country, Zagreb, to the Slavonia region, where the motorway follows a route parallel to the Sava River and further on to Serbian and Slovenian motorway networks. As a part of the road network of Croatia, it represents a part of European route E70 Bordeaux–Turin–Ljubljana–Zagreb–Belgrade–Bucharest. The motorway has facilitated accelerated economic development in the regions it connects. The motorway also connects to a number of other motorways in Croatia (from the west to the east): the A2 at the Jankomir interchange, the A1 at Lučko interchange, the A11 at Jakuševec, the A4 at Ivanja Reka and the A5 at the Sredanci interchange.

The motorway spans  between the Bregana border crossing, located near Samobor, to Slovenia and the Bajakovo border crossing to Serbia, east of Županja. It represents the shortest and the most comfortable transit traffic route between Slovenia, northern Italy, Austria, Switzerland, and southern Germany to the west; and Serbia, Bosnia and Herzegovina, Bulgaria, North Macedonia, Greece, and Turkey to the east. The route serves Sisak via the D36; Banja Luka, Bosnia and Herzegovina via the D5 and Stara Gradiška border crossing; Osijek via the A5; and Vinkovci via the D55. The A3 motorway route is complete since no extensions or alterations to the route are planned by applicable legislation.

The A3 motorway consists of two traffic lanes and an emergency lane in each driving direction along its entire length. As of September 2010, the motorway has 21 interchanges, providing access to numerous towns and cities and the Croatian state road network. Almost all of the existing interchanges are trumpet interchanges, except for Lučko, which is a stack interchange, and Jankomir, Kosnica, Ivanja Reka and Sredanci, which are cloverleaf interchanges. The motorway follows Pan-European Corridor X, and forms junctions with Pan-European Corridors Vb and Vc within Croatia.

An automatic traffic monitoring and guidance system is in place along the motorway. It consists of measuring, control and signaling devices, located in zones where driving conditions may vary—at interchanges, near viaducts, bridges, and in zones where fog is known to occur. The system comprises variable traffic signs used to communicate changing driving conditions, possible restrictions and other information to motorway users.

There are numerous rest areas along the motorway, providing various types of services ranging from simple parking spaces and restrooms to filling stations, restaurants and motels.  The A3 motorway is operated by Hrvatske autoceste, the state-owned company tasked with the management, construction, and maintenance of Croatian motorways.

Zagreb suburban interchanges 

The route between Bobovica and Ivanja Reka interchanges (inclusive) serves as a part of Zagreb bypass, and it is therefore not tolled. The A3 section of the bypass also comprises junctions to a number of other motorways: the A1 at the Lučko interchange, the A2 at the Jankomir interchange, the A11 motorway at the Jakuševec interchange, and the A4 at the Ivanja Reka interchange. Two interchanges east of Zagreb, Rugvica and Križ, have recently been built to fill in  gaps between the Ivanja Reka, Ivanić-Grad and Popovača interchanges, respectively. Even though the sections east of Rugvica are not parts of Zagreb bypass proper (they are tolled), the area has recently shown a rise in the population as it comprises several Zagreb suburbs and commuter towns. The consequent increase of commuter traffic volume, overall increase of the motorway transit traffic and plans for construction of a Sava River port in Rugvica warranted construction of the additional interchanges.

The A3 section of Zagreb bypass is currently the busiest section of the Croatian motorway network, with annual average daily traffic (AADT) volume exceeding 40,000 vehicles, leading to congestion of the six-lane bypass at peak hours, especially during the summer, when tourist traffic adds to the congestion. The mainline toll plazas at Bobovica and Ivanja Reka can both become bottlenecks at such times. The alternative to the bypass is going through the city via Ljubljanska, Zagrebačka and Slavonska avenues. Despite being a shorter and a more direct route, those avenues are much more congested than the bypass at rush hours and they contain at-grade intersections and traffic lights at some of their junctions.

Toll 

The A3 is a partially tolled motorway based on the vehicle classification in Croatia. The westernmost section of the motorway, spanning the Bobovica interchange and the Bregana border crossing, is tolled at Bregana toll plaza using an open toll collection system; the motorway sections east of Ivanja Reka interchange are tolled using a closed toll collection system, integrated with the A5 motorway as the two connect at the Sredanci interchange, forming a unified toll collection system. As of October 2010, Bregana toll plaza charges 5.00 kuna (0.68 euro) to passenger cars and 20.00 kuna (2.74 euro) to semi-trailer trucks. The toll charged along the A3 route between Ivanja Reka and Lipovac varies depending on the distance travelled and ranges from 3.00 kuna (0.41 euro) to 105.00 kuna (14.38 euro) for passenger cars and 10.00 kuna (1.37 euro) to 350.00 kuna (47.95 euro) for semi-trailer trucks. The toll is payable in either Croatian kuna or euros and by major credit cards, debit cards and a number of prepaid toll collection systems, including various types of smart cards issued by the motorway operator and ENC—an electronic toll collection (ETC) system which is shared at most motorways in Croatia and provides drivers with discounted toll rates for dedicated lanes at toll plazas.

The toll collected by Hrvatske autoceste along the A3 motorway from January to August 2009 was reported to comprise the largest proportion of the total toll revenue collected by the company for the period: 889.8 million kuna (approximately 121.9 million euro). Even though this figure is not further decomposed into the individual sections of motorway, it is clear from the traffic volume data analysis that the largest portion of the toll revenue is collected on the sections between Zagreb and Slavonski Brod, and especially on those sections closest to the Ivanja Reka interchange.

Summertime and holiday queues at the Ivanja Reka mainline toll plaza can be considerable, a problem exacerbated during the usual weekend-to-weekend tourist stays at Croatia's coastal resorts. In such conditions, motorway users are advised to use the Rugvica and Ivanić Grad exits ahead of the Ivanja Reka interchange to avoid the queues. As of October 2010, the westbound transit traffic approaching the Ivanja Reka interchange must exit the tolled motorway network, since the existing Zagreb bypass is not tolled, and then re-enter another tolled motorway. There are plans for the outer Zagreb bypass to be integrated into the tolled motorway network as the ultimate solution for congestion at the Ivanja Reka toll plaza. That will require reconstruction of the Ivanić Grad interchange east of the Ivanja Reka toll plaza.

History

Brotherhood and Unity Highway

A modern highway connecting Zagreb and Belgrade was originally designed in the late 1940s, and construction began on April 1, 1948. A substantial portion of the work was carried out by youth from Yugoslavia and abroad through youth work actions. Nearly 300,000 youth, including Yugoslav army soldiers, took part in the construction. The  road spanning the two cities, called Brotherhood and Unity Highway before the 1990s, was completed and officially opened on July 27, 1950. Despite being called a motorway, it was a single carriageway, two-lane road with all of its intersections at-grade. Due to a shortage of construction material, the wearing course was executed in various materials—mostly concrete slabs, with some asphalt concrete sections and even some cobblestone-covered sections.

The road was originally designed to carry approximately 9,000 vehicles per day, and the original construction plans provided for subsequent conversion of the road into a four-lane motorway. In 1971, as the road gradually became congested, the plans to build the motorway on the route were approved by the Parliament of the Socialist Republic of Croatia. Unlike the other two motorway plans approved by the Croatian government, Zagreb–Split and Zagreb–Rijeka, which were cancelled after the suppression of the Croatian Spring, the Zagreb–Belgrade motorway plans remained in place and an expansion of the existing motorway into a dual-carriageway, six-lane motorway with exclusively grade-separated intersections proceeded. The additional carriageway was to be built south of the existing road, which was in turn to be widened to accommodate two traffic lanes and an emergency lane.

Prewar construction and wartime use
Construction of the A3 motorway in Croatia in its present form started in 1977, when the first six-lane (including emergency lanes) sections were constructed as a part of the Zagreb bypass. In 1979, the  section connecting the Jankomir and Lučko interchanges was the first to be completed. The  section between the Lučko and Ivanja Reka interchanges was opened in 1981, marking the completion of the A3 section of the Zagreb bypass. Unlike the remainder of the motorway, which was constructed by widening the existing road and adding the additional carriageway, these two sections were built entirely from scratch.

The first part of the six-lane motorway to be completed east of Zagreb was the  section between Ivanja Reka and Lipovljani, immediately to the east of the present day Lipovljani rest area; this was done in 1980. In order to maintain the flow of traffic on the Zagreb–Belgrade road during construction, the southern carriageway was completed first, and then the two-way traffic was rerouted to the new carriageway while the old, northern carriageway was widened and its pavement structure was replaced with a new one. Similarly, as the new carriageway extended further eastward, the at-grade intersections were replaced by interchanges or flyovers. Two further extensions of the motorway happened in 1988 and 1989—those were a  extension to Brodski Stupnik and another  one to Slavonski Brod and the present-day Slavonski Brod zapad (west) interchange.

Further construction of the motorway was suspended by the onset of the Croatian War of Independence. In October 1991, a part of the motorway between Novska and Nova Gradiška became inaccessible to the government of the Republic of Croatia due to military occupation of the area by the forces of the so-called SAO Western Slavonia. Consequently, the Novska–Nova Gradiška section was closed to all traffic. On December 21, 1994, negotiations led to the reopening of that section for transit traffic. However, the section remained unsafe for use as intermittent violence continued until May 1995, when the area was overrun by the Croatian army. Inspection of the motorway section carried out at the time revealed damage to a viaduct carrying the motorway over the Zagreb–Sisak–Vinkovci railroad and a local road near Novska. Besides the overall lack of maintenance during the period, the pavement and a number of flyovers were damaged by artillery bombardments, and the flyover approach embankments were damaged where trenches were dug.

Postwar reconstruction and completion
After the war, construction and reconstruction work resumed on the A3 motorway. The battle damage was the first to be addressed, along with removal of the trenches excavated in the flyover embankments. Similarly, unexploded ordnance and minefields left around the motorway had to be removed by minesweepers. The motorway pavement was seriously deteriorated, as evidenced by extensive ruts and cracks incurred during the four-year wartime period. Unlike repairs made to the viaducts and flyovers, mine clearance and pavement reconstruction took considerably more time to perform.

In 1996, the motorway was extended for the first time after the war. This  extension reached to Oprisavci, west of the present-day Sredanci interchange. In 1999, another  section was completed, stretching to Velika Kopanica. The single westward extension of the motorway came about in 2002 as the A3 motorway was extended  from Jankomir westward to the Bregana border crossing into Slovenia. The D4 state road was thus entirely replaced by the A3 motorway. The total investment value of the A3 motorway construction is estimated at 7 billion Croatian kuna (approximately 958.9 million euro), making the A3 the least expensive motorway in Croatia.

Further construction 

Since the A3 motorway was completed in 2006, further construction on the A3 only consists of the addition of interchanges and rest areas.

The Kosnica interchange, itself completed in May 2007, lacked access ramps to the south, to the D31 state road, which were in turn completed in November 2013.

The latest new A3 interchange, the Jakuševec interchange on the Zagreb bypass, is a cloverleaf interchange connecting the A3 to the A11 motorway and in the future the city of Zagreb via Sarajevska road. The interchange itself and the access ramps to the A11 were completed in November 2015. Further construction towards Sarajevska road is planned.

, two additional A3 interchanges are in various stages of construction or planning: Sveta Klara and Ivanić Grad. The Sveta Klara interchange is planned to provide another connection to the city of Zagreb (via Većeslava Holjevca Avenue). The interchange is designed as a trumpet. When both the Jakuševec and Sveta Klara interchanges are completed, the Buzin interchange was scheduled to be removed.

The present Ivanić Grad interchange connects the D43 state road to the A3 motorway near the city of Ivanić Grad, however, the interchange was scheduled to be reconstructed to accommodate a new motorway planned as an outer, tolled Zagreb bypass. The reconstruction is currently in the planning stages. Two further interchanges are planned: (1) Godinjak, to be located between the existing Nova Gradiška and Lužani interchanges, connecting to Požega; and (2) Lipovljani, located between the existing Kutina and Novska interchanges. These are included in applicable spatial planning documents and their designs are in development, however funding is yet to be secured. Finally, the Andautonija rest area is planned for the A3 section of the Zagreb bypass between the Jakuševec and Kosnica interchanges. It is planned to be an "A-type" rest area, which normally comprises a filling station, a restaurant and a motel.

Traffic volume 

Traffic is regularly counted by means of a traffic census at toll stations and reported by Hrvatske autoceste. The reported traffic volume gradually decreases as the motorway chainage increases and as it passes by various major destinations and the interchanges that serve them. Thus the greatest volume of traffic is registered along Zagreb bypass, especially the Jankomir–Lučko section, with 41,549 vehicle annual average daily traffic (AADT). The busiest tolled section of the motorway is Ivanja Reka–Rugvica with 27,049 AADT and 34,543 vehicle average summer daily traffic (ASDT) figures. The traffic volume gradually decreases from that section eastward to the eastern terminus of the motorway, where the lowest AADT and ASDT figures are recorded. The traffic volume decrease is somewhat more pronounced at interchanges serving Slavonski Brod and the A5 motorway (Sredanci). The seasonal traffic volume variation ranges from a 28% increase on the busiest, Ivanja Reka–Rugvica, section to a 75% volume increase, as measured on the Županja–Spačva section. Average summer season traffic volume increase on the motorway is 55%. The AADT/ASDT ratio analysis does not include Zagreb bypass, as there are no ASDT data available for the bypass.

Rest areas 

As of October 2010, there are 18 rest areas operating along the A3 motorway, and additional rest areas are planned along the existing sections of the route. Legislation provides for four types of rest areas, designated as types A through D. A-type rest areas comprise a full range of amenities, including a filling station, a restaurant and a hotel or a motel; B-type rest areas have no lodging; C-type rest areas are very common and include a filling station and a café, but no restaurants or accommodations; D-type rest areas offer parking spaces only, possibly some picnicking tables, benches and restrooms. Even though the rest areas found along the A3 motorway generally follow this ranking system, there are considerable variations, as some of them offer extra services. The filling stations regularly have small convenience stores and some of them offer LPG fuel.

The primary motorway operator, Hrvatske autoceste (HAC), leases the A, B and C type rest areas to various operators through public tenders. As of October 2010, there are three such rest area operators on the A3 motorway: INA, Nafta Promet and INA Osijek Petrol. The rest area operators are not permitted to sub-lease the fuel operations. Most of the A3 motorway rest areas are accessible to both directions of traffic. There are however rest areas which are available only to the eastbound traffic (e.g. Lužani and Brodski Stupnik rest areas) or to westbound traffic only, like Slaven and Staro Petrovo Selo rest areas. Furthermore, some rest areas offer different types of amenities to each direction of the traffic. The rest areas normally operate 24 hours per day, 7 days per week, except Stari Hrastovi (eastbound) rest area, which is open from 7 am to 6 pm.

{| class="wikitable" 
|- 
| align=center bgcolor=#f2f2f2 colspan= 5 | List of A3 motorway rest areas
|- 
| align=center bgcolor=#f2f2f2 | County
| align=center bgcolor=#f2f2f2 | km
| align=center bgcolor=#f2f2f2 | Name
| align=center bgcolor=#f2f2f2 | Operators
| align=center bgcolor=#f2f2f2 | Notes
|-
| Zagreb County
| 4.2
| Gradna rest area
| INA
| Facilities found at the Gradna rest area comprise a filling station selling petrol, diesel fuel and LPG, a café and restrooms.
|-
| City of Zagreb
| 17.1
| Lučko
| INA
| Facilities found at the Lučko rest area comprise a filling station selling petrol and diesel fuel, a café, a motel, an RV park, picnicking tables and restrooms.
|-
| rowspan=2|Zagreb County
| 54.8
| Ježevo
| INA
| Facilities found at the Ježevo rest area comprise a filling station selling petrol, diesel fuel and LPG, a motel, a restaurant, a café and restrooms. The motel and the restaurant are accessible to the eastbound traffic only.
|-
| 77.1
| Križ
| INA
| Facilities found at the Križ rest area comprise a filling station selling petrol and diesel fuel, a motel, a restaurant, a café, picnicking tables and restrooms. The motel and the restaurant are accessible to the eastbound traffic only.
|-
| rowspan=3|Sisak-Moslavina
| 90.2
| 
| INA
| Facilities found at the Stari Hrastovi rest area comprise a filling station selling petrol and diesel fuel, a motel, a restaurant, a café, picnicking tables and restrooms. The filling station is available to both traffic directions, but all other facilities are available to the westbound traffic only.
|-
| 116.5
| Kraljeva Velika
| INA
| Facilities found at the Kraljeva Velika rest area comprise a filling station selling petrol and diesel fuel, a restaurant, a café, picnicking tables and restrooms. The picnicking tables are available to the eastbound traffic only.
|-
| 133.1
| Novska
| INA
| Facilities found at the Novska rest area comprise a filling station selling petrol and diesel fuel, a café and restrooms.
|-
| rowspan=7|Brod-Posavina
| 157.6
| 
| HAC
| Facilities found at the Nova Gradiška rest area comprise a restaurant, a café and restrooms. The facilities are available to the eastbound traffic only. Only a parking area is available to the westbound traffic.
|-
| bgcolor=#ffdddd |164.8
| bgcolor=#ffdddd |Slaven
| bgcolor=#ffdddd |INA
| bgcolor=#ffdddd |Facilities found at the Slaven rest area comprise a filling station selling petrol and diesel fuel, a motel, a restaurant, a café, picnicking tables and restrooms. The rest area is available to the westbound traffic only.
|-
| bgcolor=#ffdddd |175.5
| bgcolor=#ffdddd |
| bgcolor=#ffdddd |INA
| bgcolor=#ffdddd |Facilities found at the Staro Petrovo Selo rest area comprise a filling station selling petrol and diesel fuel, a motel, a restaurant and restrooms. The rest area is available to the westbound traffic only.
|-
| bgcolor=#ffdddd |191.6
| bgcolor=#ffdddd |Lužani
| bgcolor=#ffdddd |Nafta Promet
| bgcolor=#ffdddd |Facilities found at the Lužani rest area comprise a filling station selling petrol and diesel fuel, a motel, a restaurant and restrooms. The rest area is available to the eastbound traffic only.
|-
| bgcolor=#ffdddd |201.4
| bgcolor=#ffdddd |
| bgcolor=#ffdddd |Nafta Promet
| bgcolor=#ffdddd |Facilities found at the Brodski Stupnik rest area comprise a filling station selling petrol and diesel fuel, a café and restrooms. The rest area is available to the eastbound traffic only.
|-
| 216.5
| Marsonija
| INA
| Facilities found at the Marsonija rest area comprise a filling station selling petrol, diesel fuel and LPG and restrooms. The LPG filling station is available to the eastbound traffic only, while the restrooms are available to the westbound traffic only.
|-
| 238.4
| Sredanci
| INA
| Facilities found at the Sredanci rest area comprise a filling station selling petrol and diesel fuel, a restaurant, a café and restrooms. The facilities are available to the eastbound traffic only. Only a parking area is available to the westbound traffic.
|-
| rowspan=4|Vukovar-Srijem
| 258.7
| 
| 
| Facilities found at the Babina Greda rest area comprise a filling station selling petrol and diesel fuel, a café and restrooms. The facilities are available to the eastbound traffic only. Only a parking area is available to the westbound traffic.
|-
| 271.3
| Rastovica
| INA
| Facilities found at the Rastovica rest area comprise a filling station selling petrol and diesel fuel, a café and restrooms. The facilities are available to the westbound traffic only. Only a parking area is available to the eastbound traffic.
|-
| 283.1
| Bošnjaci
| HAC
| Facilities found at the Bošnjaci rest area comprise picnicking tables and restrooms.
|-
| 298.4
| Spačva
| HAC
| Facilities found at the Spačva rest area comprise a motel, a restaurant and restrooms.

Exit list 

These are the exits on the A3 motorway, including those under construction.

{| class="wikitable"
|- 
!scope="col"|County
!scope="col"|km
!scope="col"|Exit
!scope="col"|Name
!scope="col"|Destination
!scope="col"|Notes
|-
| rowspan= 6|Zagreb County
| bgcolor=#ddffdd |0.0
| bgcolor=#ddffdd align=center |
| bgcolor=#ddffdd |Bregana border crossing
| bgcolor=#ddffdd | A2
| bgcolor=#ddffdd |Border crossing to Slovenia. The motorway extends as Slovenian A2 motorway.The western terminus of the motorway and the western terminus of European route E70 concurrency.
|-
| 1.0
| align=center |
| colspan=3 |Bregana toll plaza
|-
| 2.5
| align=center | 1
| Samobor
| 
| Links Samobor, Bregana and Žumberak nature park
|-
| 4.2
| align=center |
| colspan=3 |Gradna rest area
|-
| 8.8
| align=center | 2
| Sveta Nedjelja
| 
| Links Samobor and Sveta Nedjelja
|-
|
| align=center | 3
| Rakitje
| 
| Link to Rakitje
|-
| rowspan= 6|City of Zagreb
| 14.6
| align=center | 4
| Zagreb zapad
| 
| Connection to A2 motorway and to the City of Zagreb via Ljubljanska Avenue.The western terminus of the D1 state road concurrency; the D1 is not signposted along the A3.
|-
| 17.1
| align=center |
| colspan=3 |Zagreb rest area
|-
| bgcolor=#ddffdd |19.5
| bgcolor=#ddffdd align=center | 5
| bgcolor=#ddffdd | Lučko
| bgcolor=#ddffdd |
| bgcolor=#ddffdd |Connection to A1 motorway and to the City of Zagreb via Jadranska Avenue.The western terminus of European routes E65/E71 concurrency.The eastern terminus of the D1 state road concurrency and the western terminus of D3 state road concurrency; the state roads are not signposted along the A3.
|-
| bgcolor=#ffdead |26.2
| bgcolor=#ffdead align=center | 
| bgcolor=#ffdead |Sveta Klara
| bgcolor=#ffdead |
| bgcolor=#ffdead |A planned connection to the City of Zagreb via Novi Zagreb and Većeslava Holjevca Avenue
|-
| 27.3
| align=center | 6
| Buzin
| 
| Connection to the City of Zagreb via Savezne Republike Njemačke Street and Novi Zagreb, Zagreb airport and to Velika Gorica
|-
| bgcolor=#ffdddd |28.3
| bgcolor=#ffdddd align=center | 7
| bgcolor=#ffdddd |Jakuševec
| bgcolor=#ffdddd |
| bgcolor=#ffdddd |Interchange to the A11 motorway, providing connection to Velika Gorica and in the future to Zagreb via Sarajevska Road.
|-
| rowspan= 10|Zagreb County
| 35.5
| align=center | 8
| Kosnica
| 
| Connection to the City of Zagreb via Radnička Road (Ž1029 to the north) and to Velika Gorica and Zagreb Airport (D30 to the south) 
|-
| 39.6
| colspan=4 align=center|Sava River Bridge
|-
| bgcolor=#ddffdd |40.3
| bgcolor=#ddffdd align=center | 9
| bgcolor=#ddffdd |Zagreb istok
| bgcolor=#ddffdd |
| bgcolor=#ddffdd |Connection to A4 motorway and the City of Zagreb via Slavonska Avenue.The eastern terminus of European routes E65/E71 concurrency.The eastern terminus of D3 state road concurrency; the D3 is not signposted along the A3.
|-
| 
| align=center | 10
| Otok Svibovski
| 
| Connection to Otok Svibovski, Dumovec, Zagreb-east Business Zone and IKEA Zagreb
|-
| 48.7
| align=center | 11
| Dugo Selo
| 
| Connection to Dugo Selo and Rugvica
|-
| 
| align=center |
| colspan=3 |Zagreb-east toll plaza
|-
| 54.8
| align=center |
| colspan=3 |Ježevo rest area
|-
| 65.3
| align=center | 12
| Ivanić Grad
| 
| Connection to Ivanić Grad and Čazma
|-
| 74.6
| align=center | 13
| Križ
| 
| Connection to Križ
|-
| 77.1
| align=center |
| colspan=3 |Novoselec rest area
|-
| rowspan=7|Sisak-Moslavina
| 88.2
| align=center | 14
| Popovača
| 
| Connection to Popovača, Sisak and Lonjsko polje nature park
|-
| 90.2
| align=center |
| colspan=3 |Stari Hrastovi rest area
|-
| 105.9
| align=center | 15
| Kutina
| 
| Connection to Kutina and Garešnica
|-
| 116.5
| align=center | 
| colspan=3 |Kraljeva Velika rest area
|-
|
| align=center | 16
| Lipovljani
| 
| Connection to Lipovljani
|-
| 127.1
| align=center | 17
| Novska
| 
| Connection to Novska, Jasenovac and Lipik
|-
| 133.1
| align=center |
| colspan=3 |Stari Grabovac rest area
|-
| rowspan=14 |Brod-Posavina
| 151.9
| align=center | 18
| Okučani
| 
| Connection to Okučani, Pakrac, Lipik, Daruvar and Banja Luka, Bosnia and Herzegovina
|-
| 157.6
| align=center |
| colspan=3 |Dragalić rest area
|-
| 167.4
| align=center | 19
| Nova Gradiška
| 
| Connection to Nova Gradiška and Požega
|-
| bgcolor=#ffdead | 
| bgcolor=#ffdead align=center | 20
| bgcolor=#ffdead |Požega
| bgcolor=#ffdead |
| bgcolor=#ffdead |Planned connection to Požega
|-
| bgcolor=#ffdddd |175.5
| bgcolor=#ffdddd align=center |
| bgcolor=#ffdddd colspan=2 |Staro Petrovo Selo rest area
| bgcolor=#ffdddd |Accessible to westbound traffic only
|-
| 189.9
| align=center | 21
| Lužani
| 
| Connection to Lužani, Pleternica and Požega
|-
| bgcolor=#ffdddd |191.6
| bgcolor=#ffdddd align=center |
| bgcolor=#ffdddd colspan=2 |Lužani rest area
| bgcolor=#ffdddd |Accessible to eastbound traffic only
|-
| bgcolor=#ffdddd |201.4
| bgcolor=#ffdddd align=center |
| bgcolor=#ffdddd colspan= 2 |Brodski Stupnik rest area
| bgcolor=#ffdddd |Accessible to eastbound traffic only
|-
| 211.1
| align=center | 22
| Slavonski Brod zapad
| 
| Western connection to Slavonski Brod
|-
| 216.5
| align=center |
| colspan=3 |Marsonija rest area
|-
| 221.6
| align=center | 23
| Slavonski Brod istok
| 
| Eastern connection to Slavonski Brod
|-
| 238.4
| align=center |
| colspan=3 |Sredanci rest area
|-
| 241.4
| align=center | 24
| Sredanci
| 
| Connection to A5 motorway
|-
| 249.2
| align=center | 25
| Velika Kopanica
| 
| Connection to Velika Kopanica and Slavonski Šamac
|-
| rowspan=10 |Vukovar-Syrmia
| 258.7
| align=center |
| colspan=3 |Sava rest area
|-
| 261.8
| align=center | 26
| Babina Greda
| 
| Connection to Babina Greda and Slavonski Šamac.
|-
| 271.3
| align=center |
| colspan=3 |Rastovica rest area
|-
| 274.0
| align=center | 27
| Županja
| 
| Connection to Županja, Vinkovci, Vukovar and Orašje, Bosnia and Herzegovina
|-
| 283.1
| align=center |
| colspan=3 |Bošnjaci rest area
|-
| 291.2
| align=center | 28
| Spačva
| 
| Connection to Vrbanja and Brčko, Bosnia and Herzegovina.
|-
| 298.4
| align=center |
| colspan=3 |Spačva rest area
|-
| 300.1
| align=center |
| colspan=3 |Lipovac toll plaza
|-
| 304.0
| align=center | 29
| Lipovac
| 
| Connection to Lipovac, Tovarnik, Vukovar and Ilok
|-
| bgcolor=#ddffdd |306.5
| bgcolor=#ddffdd align=center |
| bgcolor=#ddffdd |Bajakovo border crossing
| bgcolor=#ddffdd | A3
| bgcolor=#ddffdd |Border crossing to Serbia.The route continues as Serbian motorway A3.The eastern terminus of the motorway and the eastern terminus of European route E70 concurrency.

See also 

 International E-road network
 Transport in Croatia

References 

Motorways in Croatia
Roads in Zagreb
Zagreb County
Sisak-Moslavina County
Brod-Posavina County
Vukovar-Syrmia County
Buildings and structures in Brod-Posavina County